Nabil Neghiz (born 25 September 1967) is an Algerian football manager and the current head coach of USM Khenchela.

Career 

He first managed Mouloudia de Kaous, where he promoted them to the Inter-regions in 2006–2007, Nabil Neghiz then managed l'Entente de Collo in 2008–2009, promoting them to the 3rd division. He then became assistant manager along with the Brazilian Joao Alves at CS Constantine. He later returned to CRB Ain Fakroun. Under his management, the club gets promoted twice to obtain a place in the 3rd division.

Neghiz chose not to manage the team the next season. He began his season in 2013–2014 with WA Tlemcen in Ligue 2. He reached an agreement to leave the club before rejoining l'Olympique de Médéa to finish the season.

Neghiz became the interim manager of the Algeria national football team after the departure of Algerian manager Christian Gourcuff.

On 20 November 2017 he signed a contract with a Saudi club Ohud in his first experience outside Algeria.

References

External links
Nabil Neghiz at Footballdatabase

Algerian football managers
Living people
Olympique de Médéa managers
Algeria national football team managers
1967 births
Algerian expatriate sportspeople in Saudi Arabia
Expatriate football managers in Saudi Arabia
Saudi Professional League managers
Ohod Club managers
People from Jijel
JS Saoura managers
Algerian expatriate football managers
21st-century Algerian people
USM Khenchela managers